Mbilinga FC is a Gabonese football club based in Port-Gentil, Ogooué-Maritime province. They play in the Gabon Championnat National D2.

In 1996 the team has won Gabon Championnat National D1.

Achievements
Gabon Championnat National D1: 1
 1996

Stadium
Currently the team plays at the Stade Pierre Claver Divounguy.

Performance in CAF competitions
CAF Champions League: 2 appearances
1995 African Cup of Champions Clubs – First Round
1997 CAF Champions League

References

External links
http://scoreshelf.com/wmbb/en/Mbilinga_FC

Football clubs in Gabon